Events in the year 1989 in Bulgaria.

Incumbents 

 General Secretaries of the Bulgarian Communist Party: Todor Zhivkov (from 1954 until November 10) Petar Mladenov (from November 10 until 1990)
 Chairmen of the Council of Ministers: Georgi Atanasov

Events 

 Long time ruler Zhivkov is ousted and a multiparty system is introduced. The opposition Union of Democratic Forces (UDF) party is formed.

References 

 
1980s in Bulgaria
Years of the 20th century in Bulgaria
Bulgaria
Bulgaria